Keiko Iwasaka  is a Japanese novelist.

Biography 
Iwasaki was born in Nara or Osaka, Japan on June 17, 1946. She began writing poetry in high school, and began writing novels after graduating from Kwansei Gakuin University. She is married to Takayuki Kiyooka.

She won the Noma Literary Prize in 1986 for her novel . She was awarded the 2000  for her .

She also wrote two nonfiction works about the poets  and Mokutarō Kinoshita. Reviewers wrote positively about both books.

Selected works 

 , 1986
 , 1992
 , 1994
 , 2000

References

External link 

 Official website

1946 births
Living people
Kwansei Gakuin University alumni
20th-century Japanese novelists